This is a list of listed buildings in Thisted Municipality.  Thisted Municipality is in Denmark.\

The list

References

External links

 Danish Agency of Culture

Buildings and structures in Thisted Municipality
Thisted